Hypsibarbus is a genus of cyprinid fish that is found in freshwater in Mainland Southeast Asia, including the Thai-Malay Peninsula.

Species 
 Hypsibarbus antiquus Roberts & Jumnongthai, 1999 – prehistoric (fossil)
 Hypsibarbus annamensis (Pellegrin & Chevey, 1936)
 Hypsibarbus birtwistlei (Herre, 1940)
 Hypsibarbus huguenini (Bleeker, 1853)
 Hypsibarbus lagleri Rainboth, 1996
 Hypsibarbus macrosquamatus (Đ. Y. Mai, 1978)
 Hypsibarbus malcolmi (H. M. Smith, 1945) (Goldfin tinfoil barb)
 Hypsibarbus myitkyinae (Prashad & Mukerji, 1929)
 Hypsibarbus oatesii (Boulenger, 1893)
 Hypsibarbus pierrei (Sauvage, 1880)
 Hypsibarbus salweenensis Rainboth, 1996
 Hypsibarbus suvattii Rainboth, 1996
 Hypsibarbus vernayi (Norman, 1925)
 Hypsibarbus wetmorei (H. M. Smith, 1931)

References 

 

 
Cyprinid fish of Asia
Cyprinidae genera